Tayyibe Gülek (born 1968, Adana) is a Turkish economist and politician.

Biography
Gulek received her B.A. with honors in economics from Harvard University in 1991 and her M.Sc. degree in 1992 from the London School of Economics. She started her professional career as an advisor to the Chief Coordinator of Economic Policy at the Prime Ministry where she worked on projects such as the Baku-Tbilisi-Ceyhan pipeline, economics coordination, European Community coordination, and the Southeastern Anatolia Project.

In 1999, she was elected to the Turkish Grand National Assembly (parliament) representing Adana for the Democratic Left Party. During her term in office, she was a member of the Turkish delegation to the Parliamentary Assembly of the Council of Europe, where she was Vice Chair of the Committee on Human Rights, member of the Committee on Health and Family Affairs, and a member of the Committee on Equality between Men and Women. In 2002, she became Minister of State responsible for Cyprus and for Turks living abroad.

She is the daughter of the Kasım Gülek.

References

External links
 Who is Who - Tayyibe Gülek 

Turkish women economists
Turkish economists
1968 births
People from Adana
Living people
Harvard College alumni
Alumni of the London School of Economics
Deputies of Adana
Democratic Left Party (Turkey) politicians
Women government ministers of Turkey
Government ministers of Turkey
Members of the 21st Parliament of Turkey
Members of the 57th government of Turkey
21st-century Turkish women politicians
21st-century Turkish politicians
Ministers of State of Turkey